Corridor 10 is the TransJakarta bus rapid transit corridor that operates from the PGC 2 BRT Station to the Tanjung Priok bus terminal. The streets traversed by corridor 10 are along Jalan Enggano and the Djakarta Bypass (which is now divided into Jalan Yos Sudarso, Jalan Jenderal Ahmad Yani, Jalan Mayjen DI Panjaitan and Jalan Mayjen Sutoyo). Corridor 10 is integrated with the KRL Commuterline Cikarang Loop Line service at the Jatinegara Station BRT Station, and the Tanjung Priok Line at the Tanjung Priuk railway station and bus terminal.

Corridor 10 began its service along with corridor 9 on December 31, 2010 to support the 2011 Southeast Asian Games.

From October 23, 2017, a toll/express route operates from PGC towards Tanjung Priok during the peak hours of 06.00-10.00 and 16.00-20.00. Thee toll/express routes use the toll road to avoid traffic jams in the regular corridor. The bus enters the toll road after Penas Kalimalang and then exits the toll road prior to the Plumpang Pertamina bus stop, then continues through regular corridor towards Tanjung Priok. The toll/express route from Tanjung Priok towards PGC also operates during 06.00-10.00 and 16.00-20.00. From Tanjung Priok, the bus enters the toll road after Sunter Kelapa Gading and exits the toll road before Penas Kalimalang, then continues through regular corridor stops towards PGC.

A bypass route between Cililitan and Dukuh Atas also operates between 06.00 and 09.00. Bypass routes use other corridor(s) to avoid traffic jams in regular corridor. Corridor 10 uses the normal corridor to Cawang UKI-Pemuda Pramuka BPKP and then turns to corridor 4 to Dukuh Atas.

List of BRT Stations 
 Currently, all bus stops are served by buses 24 hours a day.

Cross-corridor routes

Corridor 10D (Tanjung Priok–Kampung Rambutan)

Corridor 10H (Tanjung Priok–Blok M) 

 Stations indicated by a <- sign has a one way service towards Tanjung Priok only. Stations indicated by a -> sign has a one way service towards Blok M only.

Fleets 

 Hino RK8 R260, blue (PPD)
 Zhongtong Bus LCK6180GC Euro 5, white-dark blue (PPD)
 Hino RK8 R260, blue (BMP, night bus (22:00-05:00))
 Scania K310IB 6×2, white-blue (MYS)
 Mercedes-Benz OH 1626 NG M/T, white-blue (PKT)
 Mercedes-Benz OH 1626 NG A/T, white-blue (MYS)
 Mercedes-Benz OH 1526 NG, white-light blue (TJ, only operates at corridor 10H)
 Volvo B11R 6×2 A/T, white-blue (SAF)

Depots 

 Cawang (TJ)
 Pinang Ranti (TJ)
 Cawang (PPD)
 Pulo Gadung (PPD)
 Cakung (PPD)
 Ciputat (BMP (night bus))
 Klender (PPD)
 Pegangsaan Dua (PKT)
 Cijantung (MYS)
 Pegangsaan Dua (SAF)

See also 

 TransJakarta
 List of TransJakarta corridors

References

External links 
 

Bus routes
TransJakarta